İnönü University is a public university in Malatya, Turkey. On 28 January 1975, the Grand National Assembly of Turkey ordered the establishment of İnönü University in Malatya, the hometown of the second president of Turkey, İsmet İnönü.

İnönü University is one of the biggest public university of eastern part of Turkey. İnönü University has 6 campuses, 6 institutes, 14 faculties, 19 research centers and an innovative science and technology park (Technopolis) which is called  Malatya Technology Development Zone in Malatya. Over 90,000 students have graduated since 1975 from İnönü University. Inside the university, there is a museum commemorating İsmet İnönü, along with another museum commemorating Turgut Özal. Currently,  İnönü University has over 1600 faculty members and research assistants, around 3500 graduate students and over 41000 (approximately 1500 students from different countries) undergraduate students.

İnönü University Turgut Özal Medical Center is one of the biggest research and implementation hospital in the world. It is an approximately 1400 bed hospital with 40+ operating rooms. It serves as a district hospital and accepts patients from neighbor countries as well. It is among the top three hospitals in liver transplant in the world and also serves in other areas such as kidney transplants, bone marrow transplants and burn injuries. Turgut Özal Medical Center has Faculty of Medicine, Faculty of Dentistry, Faculty of Pharmacy, Faculty of Health Sciences and also, it has an Adult Hospital and a Liver Transplant Hospital. İnönü University has planned to have Oncology Hospital until 2018.

In addition, İnönü University has the biggest Solar Energy Center in Turkey. With this energy center, İnönü University produces its own electricity for Turgut Özal Medical Center. This center is the most innovative investment and İnönü University did it its own endowment. Solar Energy Center fulfills 30 percent of Turgut Özal Medical Center electricity requirement. İnönü University Solar Energy Center started to work May 2015.

Academics

Institutes

Institute of Social Sciences
Institute of Medical Sciences
Institute of Science and Technology
Institute of Education Sciences
Institute of Liver Transplantation
Institute of Alevilik Researches

Faculties

Faculty of Medicine
Faculty of Dentistry
Faculty of Nurse
Faculty of Pharmacy
Faculty of Health Sciences
Faculty of Law
Faculty of Divinity
Faculty of Engineering
Faculty of Arts and Sciences
Faculty of Education
Faculty of Business and Administrative Sciences
Faculty of Fine Arts and Design
Faculty of Communication
Faculty of Sports Sciences
Faculty of Player Unknown Battle Ground

Research Centers

Turgut Özal Medical Center
Environmental Problems Research and Application Center
Ottoman Period Criminal Records Research and Application Center
Traditional Handicraft Research and Application Center
Apricot Research and Application Center
Heavens Sciences Research and Application Center
Principles of Atatürk Research Center for Modern Turkish History
Experimental Animal Production and Research Center
Industry-University Cooperation Research and Application Center
Scientific and Technological Research Center
Continuing Education Research and Application Center
Distance Education Research and Application Center
Gifted Research and Application Center
Children with Disabilities Research and Application Center
Women's Problems Research and Application Center
Language Education Research and Application Center
Niyazi-i Misri Research Center
Statistics and Econometrics Research and Application Center
Beekeeping Development-Application and Research Center

Turgut Özal Medical Center

İnönü University Medical Faculty Research Hospital started its services in 1990, temporarily in the barracks of the State Hospital. The groundbreaking of one of the most important and most modern medical center projects of the country; Turgut Özal Medical Center was laid in 1991 and the center was completed in five years, and started its services in 1996. İnönü University Turgut Özal Medical Center is in the campus of the İnönü University, which is founded on 7.000 decades, on Highway 309, 10 kilometers east of Malatya. The total area of Turgut Özal Medical Center is 124.000 square meters. The exterior of the center has heat insulated and high reflective glass and curtain walls with barriers. There are no windows opening outside. The air-conditioning includes heating for all closed areas, hygienic air-conditioning for operating rooms and intensive-care units, cooling and ventilation operators, cooling groups and exhausters. The hospital serves with 16 floors, 1400 beds, 31 services, 20+ intensive cares and 40+ operating rooms. It serves as a district hospital and accepts patients from neighbor countries as well. It is among the top three hospitals in liver transplant in the world and also serves in other areas such as kidney transplants, bone marrow transplants and burn injuries. Most of the patient rooms are for two patients and the rooms have their own bathrooms. Every room has central oxygen and vacuum systems. There is a guesthouse for the companions of the patient who are from out of the city; and also a companion mothers’ unit for the mothers of the children who are in intensive care. With the contemporary health care insight, the patient-centered hospital aims at customer satisfaction both internally and externally. In 2007 the process for Quality Management Systems had started and 2009 the hospital received TSE EN ISO 9001:2008 Quality Management Systems certificate. This is the first time a state hospital has received these certification.

Faculty of Engineering

İnönü University Faculty of Engineering established in 1987. Currently, Faculty of Engineering has eight active departments which are Chemical Engineering (1988), Food Engineering (1990), Mining Engineering (1992), Electronics and Electricity Engineering (1993), Mechanical Engineering (1999), Civil Engineering (2009), Computer Science (2009) and Biomedical Engineering (2012). In addition, university plans to accept students to Industrial Engineering (1987) and Mechatronics Engineering (2012) as soon as possible.

Rectors of İnönü University

Notable alumni

Yasin Kartoğlu (Mayor of Başakşehir (District of Istanbul))
Ali Özen                                      
Ankaralı Namık (Turkish Singer)
Miraç Akdoğan (Former Member of Turkish Parliament)
Zeynep Kınacı
Mustafa Şahin (Former Member of Turkish Parliament)
Kadir Koçdemir (Former Member of Turkish Parliament)
Abdulkadir Karaduman (Member of Turkish Parliament)
H. Uğur Polat (Former Mayor of Malatya, Former Mayor of Yeşilyurt, Malatya))

References

External links
Inönü University

İnönü University
Universities and colleges in Turkey
İsmet İnönü
Education in Malatya
State universities and colleges in Turkey
Educational institutions established in 1975
Buildings and structures in Malatya Province
1975 establishments in Turkey